Tholoarctus is a genus of tardigrades in the family Styraconyxidae. The genus was named and first described by Kristensen and Renaud-Mornant in 1983.

Species
The genus includes two species:
 Tholoarctus natans Kristensen & Renaud-Mornant, 1983
 Tholoarctus oleseni Jørgensen, Boesgaard, Møbjerg & Kristensen, 2014

References

Further reading
 Kristensens & Renaud-Mornant, 1983 : Existence d'arthrotardigrades semi-benthiques de genres nouveaux de la sous-famille des Styraconyxinae subfam. nov. Cahiers de Biologie Marine (Marine Biology Books), vol. 24, no 3, p. 337-353.

Styraconyxidae
Tardigrade genera
Animals described in 1983